In Greek and Roman mythology, Iphis or Iphys (Îphis , gen. Ἴφιδος Ī́phidos) was a child of Telethusa and Ligdus in Crete, born female and raised male, who was later transformed by the goddess Isis into a man.

Mythology 

According to the Roman poet Ovid's Metamorphoses, there was a humbly born, but well-respected, man named Ligdus who lived in Phaestus with his pregnant wife, Telethusa. Ligdus said he wished for two things: that his wife delivers the baby with as little pain as possible, and that the child would be a boy. As the couple was poor, they could not afford a dowry if their unborn child was born a girl. Ligdus was forced to come to the conclusion that they must kill the child if it was female. The couple cried, but Ligdus' mind was made up. Telethusa despaired, but was visited in the middle of the night by the Egyptian goddess Isis, along with a train of other gods: Anubis, Bastet, Apis, Harpocrates, Osiris, and the Egyptian serpent. Isis advised her to disobey her husband's orders and to keep the child, regardless of if it was a girl and guaranteed any needed future assistance to the woman. When Telethusa gave birth to a girl, she concealed her daughter's sex from her husband and raised her daughter as a boy. Lidgus named him Iphis, after his father; Telethusa was happy with the name, as it was gender neutral.

As Iphis reached the age of adolescence, Ligdus, still unaware of the truth, arranged for his son to marry Ianthe, daughter of Telestes. Unaware of the truth and taking her suitor for a man like everyone else, Ianthe fell in love with Iphis, with whom she had been instructed alongside and shared the same teachers. Likewise, Iphis fell deeply in love with Ianthe. Iphis lamented and prayed to Juno for assistance, as she wished to marry Ianthe, but knew it would be impossible as she was actually a woman. Telethusa procrastinated the wedding of her daughter, Iphis, until she was unable to delay any longer. One day before the wedding, the deeply concerned and desperate Telethusa brought Iphis to the temple of Isis and prayed to the goddess to help her daughter. Isis was deeply moved and responded by transforming Iphis into a man. The male Iphis married Ianthe and the two lived happily ever after, their marriage being presided over by Juno, Venus, and Hymenaios.

The story of Iphis is similar to that of Leucippus from Phaestus, Crete, and could be a variant thereof.

Interpretations 
The story of Iphis and Ianthe is the only mythological account of female same-sex desire, not only in Ovid, but in all of Graeco-Roman mythology. Whether Ovid disapproves of or is sympathetic toward female homoerotic desire has been a point of contention for scholars. The main social inscription in this myth is the need for a male heir in a patriarchal society and the inevitable misogyny this creates.

In popular culture 
 The 17th-century publisher Humphrey Moseley once claimed to possess a manuscript of a play based on the Iphis and Ianthe story, by William Shakespeare. Scholars have treated the claim with intense skepticism; the play has not survived.
 Ali Smith's 2007 novel Girl Meets Boy is based on Ovid's story of Iphis and Ianthe, and is part of the Canongate Myth Series.
 The Mechanisms' 2013 album Tales To Be Told features a song called "Iphis" based on the story of Iphis and Ianthe.
 Liberty of London has fabric and leatherwork patterns named after both Iphis and Ianthe.

Note

References 

 Publius Ovidius Naso, Metamorphoses translated by Brookes More (1859-1942). Boston, Cornhill Publishing Co. 1922. Online version at the Perseus Digital Library.
 Publius Ovidius Naso, Metamorphoses. Hugo Magnus. Gotha (Germany). Friedr. Andr. Perthes. 1892. Latin text available at the Perseus Digital Library.

Metamorphoses into the opposite sex in Greek mythology
Metamorphoses characters
Cretan characters in Greek mythology
Characters in Roman mythology
Transgender topics and mythology
LGBT themes in Greek mythology
Fictional LGBT characters in literature